Lara Stalder (born 15 May 1994) is a Swiss ice hockey forward and member of the Swiss national ice hockey team, currently playing with Brynäs IF Dam of the Swedish Women's Hockey League (SDHL). She played with the Minnesota Duluth Bulldogs women's ice hockey team from 2013 to 2017, and with Linköping HC from 2017 to 2019.

Playing career 
Across four seasons with Minnesota-Duluth, Stalder put up 148 points in 134 games, leading the team in points in her final season, as well as being named WCHA Player of the Year and Student-Athlete of the Year, and being a top-three finalist for the Patty Kazmaier Award. In 2016, she was drafted 20th overall by the Boston Pride of the National Women's Hockey League (NWHL).

After missing most of the 2018–19 season due to a shoulder injury, Stalder left Linköping to sign with Brynäs. In 2020, she was named SDHL Player of the Year after putting up 71 points in 36 games, being the first woman to win Guldhjälmen. The 42 goals she would score that year is the second highest single-season total in SDHL history, and her 71 points the third highest single-season total in SDHL history.

International  
Stalder made her senior national team debut at the 2011 IIHF Women's World Championship. She has represented Switzerland at the Winter Olympics in 2014 and won the bronze medal after defeating Sweden in the bronze medal playoff. She would score 6 points in 6 games at the 2018 Winter Olympics, as Switzerland finished in 5th place.

Career statistics

Awards and honors

NCAA
WCHA Offensive Player of the Week (Week of 17 January 2017)
WCHA Offensive Player of the Week (Week of 24 January 2017)
WCHA Offensive Player of the Week (Week of 31 January 2017)
WCHA Offensive Player of the Month, January 2017
Women's Hockey Commissioners' Association National Division I Player of the Month, January 2017
Patty Kazmaier Award Top-3 Finalist, 2016–17 season
2016-17 AHCA-CCM Women's University Division I First-Team All-American

SDHL 

 Guldhjälmen (Golden Helmet), MVP of the SDHL as selected by players, 2019–20 season
 SDHL Forward of the Year, 2019–20 season

References

External links

Minnesota Duluth bio

1994 births
Living people
Sportspeople from Lucerne
Swiss women's ice hockey forwards
Ice hockey players at the 2014 Winter Olympics
Ice hockey players at the 2018 Winter Olympics
Ice hockey players at the 2022 Winter Olympics
Olympic bronze medalists for Switzerland
Olympic ice hockey players of Switzerland
Olympic medalists in ice hockey
Medalists at the 2014 Winter Olympics
Brynäs IF Dam players
Linköping HC Dam players
Minnesota Duluth Bulldogs women's ice hockey players
Swiss expatriate ice hockey people
Swiss expatriate sportspeople in Sweden
Swiss expatriate sportspeople in the United States